is a railway station in the town of Hachirōgata, Akita Prefecture,  Japan, operated by JR East.

Lines
Hachirōgata Station is served by the Ōu Main Line, and is located 327.5 km from the terminus of the line at Fukushima Station.

Station layout
The station consists of one side platform and one island platform connected to the station building by a footbridge. The station is staffed.

Platforms

History
It was renamed  on November 1, 1921. The station was renamed to its present name on June 1, 1965, and a new station building was completed in December of the same year. The station was absorbed into the JR East network upon the privatization of JNR on April 1, 1987.

Passenger statistics
In fiscal 2018, the station was used by an average of 792 passengers daily (boarding passengers only).

Surrounding area
 Hachirōgata town office
 Hachirōgata post office

See also
List of railway stations in Japan

References

External links

 JR East Station information 

Railway stations in Japan opened in 1902
Railway stations in Akita Prefecture
Ōu Main Line
Hachirōgata, Akita